Achraf Kharroubi (born 25 September 1990) is a Moroccan boxer. He competed in the men's flyweight event at the 2016 Summer Olympics.

References

External links
 
 
 
 

1990 births
Living people
Moroccan male boxers
Olympic boxers of Morocco
Boxers at the 2016 Summer Olympics
Place of birth missing (living people)
Flyweight boxers
21st-century Moroccan people